Salamandrella keyserlingii, the Siberian salamander, is a species of salamander found in Northeast Asia.  It lives in wet woods and riparian groves.

Distribution
It is found primarily in Siberia east of the Sosva River and the Urals, in the East Siberian Mountains, including the Verkhoyansk Range, northeast to the Anadyr Highlands, east to the Kamchatka Peninsula and south into Manchuria, with outlying populations also in northern Kazakhstan and Mongolia, northeastern China, and on the Korean Peninsula. It is believed to be extirpated from South Korea.  An isolated population exists on Hokkaidō, Japan, in the Kushiro Shitsugen National Park.  A breeding ground of Siberian salamanders in Paegam, South Hamgyong, is designated North Korean natural monument #360.

Description
Adults are from 9.0 to 12.5 cm in length.  Their bodies are bluish-brown in color, with a purple stripe along the back.  Thin, dark brown stripes occur between and around the eyes, and also sometimes on the tail. Four clawless toes are on each foot.  The tail is longer than the body.

A single egg sac contains 50-80 eggs on average, with a female typically laying up to 240 eggs in a season.  The light-brown eggs hatch three to four weeks after being laid, releasing larval salamanders of 11–12 mm in length.

The species is known for surviving deep freezes (as low as −45 °C). In some cases, they have been known to remain frozen in permafrost for years, and upon thawing, walking off.

References

Further reading

External links

Distribution map
Malyarchuk B., Derenko M. et al. Phylogeography and molecular adaptation of Siberian salamander Salamandrella keyserlingii based on mitochondrial DNA variation, 2010

keyserlingii
Cryozoa
Amphibians of China
Amphibians of Japan
Amphibians of Korea
Amphibians of Mongolia
Amphibians of Russia
Amphibians described in 1870